Elna Charlotte Elvira Montgomery (23 October 1885 – 13 June 1981) was a Swedish figure skater. She competed at the 1908 Summer Olympics, the first Olympics where figure skating was contested, and finished fourth out of five skaters.

Results

References

External links
 Sports-Reference page

Figure skaters at the 1908 Summer Olympics
Olympic figure skaters of Sweden
Swedish female single skaters
1885 births
1981 deaths
20th-century Swedish women